Alicia Suazo was a member of the Utah State Senate from 2001 to 2002.

Suazo was born in Tooele, Utah.  She received a bachelor's degree from the University of Utah and worked as a teacher in the Salt Lake City school district.  She married Pete Suazo who was first elected to the state legislature in 1992.

When her husband died in a four-wheeling accident in 2001, Suazo was appointed to finish out his state senate term.

Sources
Utah Women and Families awards list

University of Utah alumni
Utah state senators
Living people
People from Tooele, Utah
Year of birth missing (living people)